Roseivirga spongicola is a Gram-negative, strictly aerobic and chemoorganotrophic bacterium from the genus of Roseivirga which has been isolated from a marine sponge on the Bahamas.

References

External links
Type strain of Roseivirga spongicola at BacDive -  the Bacterial Diversity Metadatabase

Cytophagia
Bacteria described in 2006